The Talisman is a 1984 fantasy novel by American writers Stephen King and Peter Straub. The plot is not related to that of Walter Scott's 1825 novel of the same name, although there is one oblique reference to "a Sir Walter Scott novel." The Talisman was nominated for the Locus and World Fantasy Awards in 1985. King and Straub followed up with a sequel, Black House (2001), that picks up with a now-adult Jack as a retired Los Angeles homicide detective trying to solve a series of murders in the small town of French Landing, Wisconsin.

Plot summary
Jack Sawyer, twelve years old, sets out from Arcadia Beach, New Hampshire, in a bid to save his mother Lily, who is dying from cancer, by finding a crystal called "the Talisman". Jack's journey takes him simultaneously through the American heartland and "the Territories", a strange fantasy land that is set in a universe parallel to that of Jack's United States. Individuals in the Territories have "twinners", or parallel individuals, in our world. Twinners' births, deaths, and (it is intimated) other major life events are usually paralleled. Twinners can also "flip" or migrate to the other world but only share the body of their alternate universe's analogue. When flipped, the twinner, or the actual person, will automatically start speaking and thinking the language of where they are flipping into subconsciously.

In rare instances (such as Jack's), a person may die in one world but not the other, making the survivor "single-natured", with the ability to switch back and forth, body and mind, between the two worlds. Jack is taught how to flip by a mysterious figure known as Speedy Parker, who is the twinner of a gunslinger named Parkus in the Territories. In the Territories, the beloved Queen Laura DeLoessian, the twinner of Jack's mother (a movie actress known as the "Queen of the B Movies"), is dying as well.

Jack sets off for the mystical Talisman in the Territories with help and encouragement from Speedy Parker. After running into a man named Osmond who works for Morgan Sloat's twinner, Jack leaves the village and heads down a road with the help of a soldier. Jack almost gets caught by Morgan in the woods and hides. The trees then attack Jack, nearly choking him to death and forcing him to flip back into the United States. Jack continues his journey through the U.S and gets a job working as a bartender in the fictional town of Oatley, New York. The owner, Smokey Updike, is ruthless and abusive towards Jack and holds him as a slave. 

Jack escapes Oatley a few days later and is chased by a creature named Elroy that has been stalking him throughout his stay in Oatley. He evades Elroy long enough to return to the Territories, where Jack remembers another associate of his father named Jerry Bledsoe, who died in a freak explosion. Jack then pieces that Morgan Sloat had caused the explosion by simply flipping between the two worlds. Jack returns to the American Territories after running into Elroy and Morgan again and learns that he inadvertently caused the death of seven construction workers nearby, causing severe grief within Jack and reminding him of Jerry Bledsoe. 

In Ohio, Jack meets a blind singer named Snowball, who may or may not be Speedy, who motivates Jack to continue on his journey. On the road, Jack runs into Morgan at a rest stop, flips into the Territories, and nearly drowns in a river. A large werewolf creature simply named Wolf saves Jack. The two befriend each other before Morgan arrives through a portal and uses a device that causes lighting bolts to strike. Jack flips back into his world with Wolf to escape. The two travel towards Indiana, though Wolf struggles to adjust to the United States. Jack and Wolf are arrested for vagrancy by a police officer who takes them to the Sunlight Home, a boys school for misfits.

The owner, evangelist psychopath Robert Gardner, is the twinner of Osmond, who is on the hunt for Jack. The boys are harassed by the prefects at the school, Sonny Singer and Heck Bast, among others. After a few incidents with the prefects and Gardner, wherein a student escapes the school and the kids are interrogated in the middle of the night, Jack and Wolf escape into the Territories. They learn that the 'twinner' of the school itself is a prison camp, and return soon after. The prefects fight Jack and Wolf in the bathroom and Gardner, deducing who Jack is, drugs Wolf and kidnaps Jack, torturing him in an attempt to make him reveal his identity. Wolf, having been placed in a solitary confinement box, transforms into a werewolf and wreaks havoc on the school, massacring numerous students and breaking into Gardner's office. Wolf kills the prefects in Gardner's office but is shot to death by Sonny, who then bleeds to death from his wounds. Jack comforts the dying Wolf before moving on.

Jack finds Morgan Sloat's son Richard at a boarding school in Illinois. Jack attempts to persuade Richard of his adventures and Morgan's plan but is unsuccessful. After the school is transformed into a grotesque version of itself and the students turn into werewolves and attempt to goad Richard into throwing out Jack, the two escape and flip into the Territories. There they meet a man named Anders who is sending a shipment of weapons to Morgan's soldiers for a final stand against Jack. Richard, now believing he has a tumor and is hallucinating, is actually suffering from a sickness given to him by Morgan. Jack decided to take the shipment himself and plan an ambush. They travel via train through the Blasted Lands, a hellish landscape full of fireballs, mutated creatures, and smugglers. 

Jack and a sickly Richard bombard the army base, destroying most of Morgan's armada and killing Elroy and Osmond's son. Jack flips into California, where Richard finally admits to the Territories' existence. They arrive at Point Venuti and sneak into the Agincourt Hotel (the twinner of the Alhambra Inn) undetected by the remaining werewolves. They meet Speedy Parker on the beachfront, who is weak and dying. Inside the Black Castle, Jack battles stone suits of armor defending the Talisman and takes it, triggering an earthquake and disbanding the rest of the werewolves who allied with Morgan Sloat. Jack realizes there are multiple worlds beside the two he is familiar with and the Talisman is the axis of all of them. He heals Richard with the Talisman, kills Gardner on the castle steps and faces off with Morgan on the beach. Eventually he manages to kill Sloat, heals Speedy and returns to New Hampshire in a limousine. Jack reunites with Lily and uses the Talisman a final time to save his mother and the Queen.

Publication history 

The idea of writing The Talisman first took form when Stephen King moved with his family to London in early 1977. It was there he met Peter and Susan Straub, and their children. The two writers became friends, both being fans of each other's work. King and his family left London three months later to return to the United States.

Straub and King had talked multiple times before about collaborating to write a book, but nothing ever surfaced until years after King returned stateside, when the Straubs also moved to the United States. According to King, after Straub moved, "the talk got serious," and they began collaborating. Their literary friendship continued after The Talisman was published; in 1999 they began working on the sequel, Black House (2001), which deals with Jack Sawyer as an adult.

A third and final book in the Jack Sawyer series was planned.

Locations

The Territories 

When Jack "flips," he finds himself in a parallel world, which is physically smaller than the world from which he comes. Throughout the course of the novel, Jack uses the size differential as a method to travel quickly across the country. The eastern region, corresponding to the Eastern Seaboard, is the most densely populated and is governed under a feudal system headed by the Queen. The central regions, roughly corresponding to the American plains, are a grain growing area known as "the Outposts." Beyond them the western region of the Territories is a destroyed area known as "the Blasted Lands" (analogous to the American Southwest – primarily New Mexico, where the atomic bomb was tested). It apparently was wrecked by radioactivity and has dangerous mutants and occasional fireballs.

Alhambra Hotel 
Where Jack begins his quest and meets Speedy Parker. It is a decaying building on the New Hampshire coast, at the end of the novel deserted except for Jack's mother. Its parallel in the Territories is the summer palace of the dying queen. Another location near the hotel is Arcadia Funworld, a decrepit theme park that Speedy works at.

The Alhambra was also a notable location in King's novel The Tommyknockers.

Oatley Tap 
A bar in the fictional western New York town of the same name. The owner, Smokey, holds Jack as a virtual slave. Jack despises him for this mistreatment. Also working with Jack is Smokey’s girlfriend Lori, and another unnamed worker. Near the end of the novel the Oatley Tap bursts into flames after a grill explodes, killing Smokey and Lori and burning down the town. Elroy, a quadrupedal animal, arrives in Oatley to capture Jack but is unsuccessful after attempting to kill the boy inside the Oatley tunnel. Elroy is later killed by Jack in the fight at the training camp after they leave the Blasted Lands.

Sunlight Gardener's School 
When Jack and Wolf are accused of mischievous "hitchhiking" and "trouble-making" by a highway police officer, they are sent by the court to a camp/school for troubled youths run by evangelist Robert "Sunlight" Gardner/Osmond. It is located in eastern Indiana and parallels a terrible open pit mine in the Territories where slaves are used to gather radioactive ore for Morgan. Jack and Wolf are held as wards of the state in the Sunlight Home for one month. In the fields behind the school sits a large rectangular metal box, appropriately named “the box” that Gardner uses as punishment for his students. Jack and Wolf escape after Wolf transforms and brutally kills a number of students in the school. Sunlight Gardener escapes during the attack and Wolf is shot four times by Sonny Singer (a prefect at the school) and dies of his injuries. Likewise, it is destroyed by a freak explosion at the end of the novel.

Jack notes that some students are rebellious and despise Gardner, notably a boy named Ferd Janklow who attempted to run away but was caught and murdered.

Thayer School 
A boarding school for wealthy boys in Springfield, Illinois. Jack meets up with his friend Richard here. The school is shifted into another plane by Morgan, where wolves and gargoyle-like creatures try to seize Jack. The school sits over a long-forgotten train depot that Jack and Richard use in the Territories. The twinner of Osmond’s son stayed at Thayer before leaving.

Agincourt Hotel 
In the ruined town of Point Venuti on the northern California coast. It is a mysterious abandoned black structure similar to the Alhambra. It holds the Talisman and has many different incarnations depending on the alternate universe. In the Territories, it appears as a black castle. It is through this building's shifting forms as Jack nears the Talisman that the reader learns of a multitude of other worlds of which the Territories and America are only two.

Reception
Because Straub and King were both immensely successful and popular horror and suspense writers in their own rights, anticipation of this book was extremely strong. The publisher financed a USD$550,000 promotion budget and several articles ran which hailed the collaboration of the two writers and speculated what would be “the greatest horror novel ever written.”

Actual popular and critical reception, however, were mixed and ran the spectrum from "worst" (People: "Worst of Pages" list) and "best" (Twilight Zone: Year's Best Novel). However, with the exception of People, no critics recommended against it.

According to Publishers Weekly, the final sales figure for The Talisman in 1984 was 880,287 copies. The original hardbound edition spent 12 weeks as #1 on the New York Times Best Seller List with a total of 23 weeks in total on the list. Publishers Weekly listed it as #1 for 11 weeks, with a total of 26 weeks on the list.

The subsequent Berkley paperback edition spent 2 weeks as #1 on the New York Times best paperback list with a total of 14 weeks on the list. Publishers Weekly listed it as #1 for 3 weeks, with 13 weeks in total on the list.

Connection to The Dark Tower 
The book's sequel Black House presents a "soft" retcon that the Territories are a parallel to All-World. This is made most clear by King's introduction to The Little Sisters of Eluria where he states the pavilion where Jack Sawyer meets Sophie is the same one in The Little Sisters.

Adaptations
The Talisman has been adapted into a 2008 short film and a graphic novel much like The Stand and The Dark Tower. The first issue was published in October 2009. Del Rey planned to run "at least 24 issues"; however, only six issues were published.

A feature-length film version has been in planning for decades, and as of March 2019 was in development by Amblin Partners and The Kennedy/Marshall Company with a script by Chris Sparling. In 2021, it was revealed that Amblin would be developing the novel as a Netflix television series, with the Duffer Brothers helping with development.

See also
 "Jack Names the Planets"

References

External links
 
 The Talisman at Worlds Without End

1984 American novels
1984 fantasy novels
American fantasy novels adapted into films
Collaborative novels
Novels about parallel universes
Novels adapted into comics
Novels by Peter Straub
Novels by Stephen King
Viking Press books
Werewolf novels